The 1996 Ms. Olympia contest was an IFBB professional bodybuilding competition was held on September 20, 1996, in Chicago, Illinois. It was the 17th Ms. Olympia competition held.

Results

Notable Events
This Ms. Olympia, along with the 1995 Ms. Olympia, had the highest total prize money at a Ms. Olympia, with $115,000, with $50,000 for the winner.
This competition had only 12 competitors competing, the fewest competitors competing in Ms. Olympia ever. Only the 2000 Ms. Olympia would match this to have 12 competitors competing.
The song played during the posedown was Unbelievable by EMF.

See also
 1996 Mr. Olympia

References

 1996 Ms. Olympia held in Chicago on September 
 1996 Ms Olympia Results

External links
 Competitor History of the Ms. Olympia

Ms Olympia, 1996
1996 in bodybuilding
Ms. Olympia
Ms. Olympia
History of female bodybuilding